The discography of Stalley, an American hip hop recording artist, consists of four studio albums, seven mixtapes, six extended plays (EPs) and three collaborative albums.

Albums

Studio albums

Mixtapes

Extended plays

Collaborative albums

Singles

As lead artist

As featured artist

Guest appearances

Music videos

References 

Discographies of American artists
Hip hop discographies